Dharmadam Island (Green Island) is a small 2-hectare private island in Thalassery, Kannur District, Kerala. It lies about 100 metres from the mainland at Dharmadam.

See also

 Muzhappilangad
 Muzhappilangad beach

References

Islands of Kerala
Thalassery
Private islands of India
Islands of India
Uninhabited islands of India